Jeffrey Charles Percy Miller (31 August 1906 – 24 April 1981) was an English mathematician and computing pioneer.  He worked in number theory and on geometry, particularly polyhedra, where Miller's monster refers to the great dirhombicosidodecahedron.

He was an early member of the Computing Laboratory of the University of Cambridge. He contributed in computation to the construction and documentation of mathematical tables, and by the proposal of certain algorithms. Miller's recurrence algorithm is mentioned in the Handbook of Mathematical Functions.

As the reference says, this technique was subsequently much developed and applied, and was enunciated rather casually by Miller in a 1952 book of tables of Bessel functions.

In volume 2 of The Art of Computer Programming, Donald Knuth attributes to Miller a basic technique on formal power series, for recursive evaluation of coefficients of powers or more general functions.

In the theory of stellation of polyhedra, he made some influential suggestions to H. S. M. Coxeter. These became known as Miller's rules. The 1938 book  on the fifty-nine icosahedra resulted, written by Coxeter and Patrick du Val. In the 1930s, Coxeter and Miller found 12 new uniform polyhedra, a step in the process of their complete classification in the 1950s. Miller also made an early investigation into what is now known as the Rule 90 cellular automaton.

Dr Miller was married to Germaine Miller (née Gough) in 1934 and had three children (David, Alison and Jane).  Germaine died in Cambridge in her 100th year in March 2010 and is buried at St Andrew's Church, Chesterton, Cambridge.

Notes

Further reading
Doron Zeilberger,The J. C. P. Miller recurrence for exponentiating a polynomial, and its q-analog, Journal of Difference Equations and Applications, Volume 1, Issue 1 1995, pages 57 – 60.

1906 births
1981 deaths
English computer scientists
Cellular automatists
20th-century English mathematicians